The Tapani incident or Tapani uprising in 1915 was one of the biggest armed uprisings by Taiwanese Han and Aboriginals, including Taivoan, against Japanese rule in Taiwan. Alternative names used to refer to the incident include the Xilai Temple Incident after the Xilai Temple in Tainan, where the revolt began, and the Yu Qingfang Incident after the leader Yu Qingfang.

Revolt
Multiple Japanese police stations were stormed by Aboriginal and Han Chinese fighters under Chiang Ting (Jiang Ding) and Yü Ch'ing-fang (Yu Qingfang). The rebels declared a Da Ming Cibeiguo (大明慈悲國, Great Ming Compassionate Kingdom), the existence of which only lasted 12 days before the revolt was suppressed.

Consequences
Modern Taiwanese historiography attempts to portray the Tapani Incident as a nationalist uprising either from a Chinese (unification) or Taiwanese (independence) perspective. Japanese colonial historiography attempted to portray the incident as a large scale instance of banditry led by criminal elements. However, the Tapani Incident differs from other uprisings in Taiwan's history because of its elements of millenarianism and folk religion, which enabled Yu Qingfang to raise a significant armed force whose members believed themselves to be invulnerable to modern weaponry.

The similarities between the rhetoric of the leaders of the Tapani uprising and the Righteous Harmony Society of the recent Boxer Rebellion in China were not lost on Japanese colonial authorities, and the colonial government subsequently paid more attention to popular religion and took steps to improve colonial administration in southern Taiwan.

The aboriginals carried on with violent armed struggle against the Japanese while Han Chinese violent opposition stopped after Tapani.

See also
Wushe Incident

Notes

References

External links
Governmentality and Its Consequences in Colonial Taiwan: A Case Study of the Ta-pa-ni Incident    
When Valleys Turned Blood Red: The Ta-pa-ni Incident in Colonial Taiwan
Taiwan in Time: Magic amulets, tax breaks and a messiah

Taiwan under Japanese rule
Protests in Taiwan
1915 in Japan
1915 in Taiwan
1915 in international relations
Conflicts in 1915
Combat incidents
Rebellions in Asia
Military history of Taiwan
Military history of Japan
Taivoan people